Tommy Dunbar may refer to:

Tom Dunbar (1959–2011), outfielder for Major League Baseball's Texas Rangers
Tom Dunbar (footballer), Scottish footballer who was the first man to cross the Old Firm divide twice
Tommy Dunbar, founding member of The Rubinoos